Beijing Enterprises Holdings Limited was formed upon eight units of assets (i.e. Yanjing Beer, Sanyuan Foods, Beijing Western Style Food, Beijing Airport Expressway, Badaling Tourism, Wangfujing Department Store, Jianguo Hotel, Beijing International Switching System) in Beijing, China. It was incorporated in Hong Kong and listed on the Hong Kong Stock Exchange as red chip stock in 1997.

References

External links
 
Beijing Enterprises Holdings Limited

Companies listed on the Hong Kong Stock Exchange
Government-owned companies of China
Conglomerate companies of China
Companies based in Beijing
Companies established in 1997
Conglomerate companies of Hong Kong